Ahmadabad (also Romanized as Aḩmadābād; also known as Ahmad Abadé Jarghooye, Aḩmadābād-e Jorqūyaeh, and Ḩoseynābād) is a village in Ramsheh Rural District, Jarqavieh Olya District, Isfahan County, Isfahan Province, Iran. At the 2006 census, its population was 304, in 105 families. Ahmedabad has a new mosque on the eastern side of the village. People come to this place for all three promises of prayers.

References 

Populated places in Isfahan County